Ryan David Glynn (born November 1, 1974) is an American former professional baseball pitcher who played in Major League Baseball for the Texas Rangers, Toronto Blue Jays, and Oakland Athletics.

College and MLB career
Glynn attended college at the Virginia Military Institute until he was drafted in 1995 by the Texas Rangers in the fourth round.

NPB and CPBL career
In , Glynn pitched for the Tohoku Rakuten Golden Eagles and had a 3.96 ERA. In , he signed with the Hokkaido Nippon-Ham Fighters and had a 2.21 ERA. On January 7, he signed a one-year deal with the Yokohama BayStars.

The Lions won the CPBL Championship, and Glynn pitched in the 2011 Asia Series.

References

External links

KBO League

1974 births
Living people
American expatriate baseball players in Canada
American expatriate baseball players in Japan
American expatriate baseball players in South Korea
American expatriate baseball players in Taiwan
Baseball players from Virginia
Calgary Cannons players
Charleston RiverDogs players
Hokkaido Nippon-Ham Fighters players
Hudson Valley Renegades players
Indianapolis Indians players
KBO League pitchers
Major League Baseball pitchers
Newark Bears players
Oakland Athletics players
Oklahoma RedHawks players
Sportspeople from Portsmouth, Virginia
Charlotte Rangers players
Richmond Braves players
Rochester Red Wings players
Sacramento River Cats players
Samsung Lions players
Syracuse SkyChiefs players
Texas Rangers players
Tiburones de La Guaira players
American expatriate baseball players in Venezuela
Tigres de Aragua players
Tohoku Rakuten Golden Eagles players
Toronto Blue Jays players
Tulsa Drillers players
Virginia Military Institute alumni
VMI Keydets baseball players
Yokohama BayStars players